Konstantin Viktor Ernst Emil Karl Alexander Friedrich Prinz zu Hohenlohe-Schillingsfürst (8 September 1828 – 14 February 1896) was a k.u.k. First Obersthofmeister (Lord High Steward or the chief of staff of the imperial and royal court) and General of the Cavalry of Austria-Hungary.

Biography

Family 
Prince Konstantin of Hohenlohe-Schillingsfürst was the youngest son of Fürst Franz Joseph, 5th Prince of Hohenlohe-Schillingsfürst and his wife, Caroline Friederike Constanze of Hohenlohe-Langenburg. He had three older brothers who achieved high positions: Victor Herzog von Ratibor, President of the Prussian House of Lords, Chlodwig zu Hohenlohe-Schillingsfürst, Chancellor of Germany, and Gustav Adolf, Cardinal Prince of Hohenlohe-Schillingsfürst. In addition, he had three sisters and two other brothers died at a young age.

In 1859 Konstantin married Princess Marie zu Sayn-Wittgenstein (1837–1920) at Weimar. She was the daughter of Fürstin Carolyne zu Sayn-Wittgenstein (1819–1887) who after her divorce lived with Franz Liszt since 1848 at Weimar. In 1861 he bought  in Vienna, and the couple moved in the following year. His wife became a sponsor of Vienna's cultural life and a supporter of its social institutions. The couple had six children:
 Prince Franz Joseph zu Hohenlohe-Schillingsfürst (1861–1871)
 Prince Konrad of Hohenlohe-Schillingsfürst (1863–1918), Prime Minister of Austria-Hungary
 Prince Philipp zu Hohenlohe-Schillingsfürst (1864–1942), Pater Konstantin OSB
 Prince Gottfried zu Hohenlohe-Schillingsfürst (1867–1932), married Erzherzogin Maria Henriette von Österreich-Teschen (1883–1956)
 Prince Wolfgang zu Hohenlohe-Schillingsfürst (1869–1883)
 Princess Dorothea zu Hohenlohe-Schillingsfürst (1872–1954)

Career  
Hohenlohe went to school at the Maria-Magdalenen-Gymnasium, Breslau graduating with the Abitur in 1848. The same year he joined the military of the Austrian Empire and served in a campaign in Northern Italy in 1849. In 1854 he entered service at the Royal court in Vienna. He advanced becoming Aide-de-camp of Emperor Franz Joseph I. in 1859 and First "Obersthofmeister" with the elevated appointment to "Fürst" in 1866. He was seen as the perfect courtier, always in agreement with the political views of the Emperor. As the highest court official, Hohenlohe had many administrative and representative duties and was at the center of the political and cultural life at the Austrian Court. After the Ausgleich of 1857, the term k.u.k. was added to his title signifying that his duties were to both parts of Austria-Hungary.

In 1857, Emperor Franz Joseph I of Austria issued the decree "I have resolved to command" (Es ist Mein Wille at Wikisource) ordering the demolition of the city walls and moats. In his decree, he laid out the exact size of the Ringstrasse, the new representative boulevard, as well as the geographical positions and functions of the new buildings. Hohenlohe was responsible for buildings and properties of the Royal Court along the Ringstrasse as well as the completion of the Hofoperntheater, and the new construction of the Hofburgtheater and of two new museums, the Kunsthistorisches Museum and the Naturhistorisches Museum. The construction of the Neue Burg at the Hofburg was not completed until the First World War. Hohenlohe participated in the development of the Wiener Prater where the World Exhibition took place in 1873. The Konstantinhügel in the Prater is named after him. Hohenlohe also oversaw work for the Vienna Danube regulation.

Hohenlohe worked until his death in 1896 and was succeeded by Rudolf von Liechtenstein.

Honors and dedications 
Orders and decorations

Civil appointments
 Honorary member of the Gesellschaft der Musikfreunde, 1870
 Honoray Kurator of the Academy of Fine Arts Vienna, 1873
 Honorary Kurator of the Museum of Applied Arts, Vienna, 1873 
 Member of the Herrenhaus of Austria

Johann Strauss Jr. dedicated his waltz Geschichten aus dem Wienerwald to Hohenlohe in 1868 and Anton Bruckner dedicated his Symphony No. 4 in E-flat major to him in 1873.

Literatur 
 
 Martina Winkelhofer-Thyri: Prinz Constantin zu Hohenlohe-Schillingsfürst (1828–1896). Der große Unbekannte am Wiener Hof. In: Alma Hannig, Martina Winkelhofer-Thyri (Hrsg.): Die Familie Hohenlohe. Eine europäische Dynastie im 19. und 20. Jahrhundert. Verlag Böhlau, Köln 2013, S. 181–198.

References 

1828 births
1896 deaths
People from Ansbach (district)
House of Hohenlohe
German princes
Nobility from Vienna
Military personnel from Vienna
Austro-Hungarian generals
Members of the House of Lords (Austria)
Knights of the Golden Fleece of Austria
Grand Crosses of the Order of Saint Stephen of Hungary
Knights of Malta
Knights Grand Cross of the Order of Pope Pius IX
Grand Cordons of the Order of the Rising Sun
Grand Crosses of the Order of the Star of Romania
Recipients of the Order of the Cross of Takovo
Recipients of the Order of the White Eagle (Russia)
Recipients of the Order of St. Anna, 1st class
Recipients of the Order of Saint Stanislaus (Russian), 1st class
Recipients of the Order of St. Vladimir, 4th class
Grand Croix of the Légion d'honneur
Recipients of the Order of the Medjidie, 1st class
Obersthofmeister